The highest international goals scorer in classic field hockey is Dhyan Chand of India, he scored 570 goals in 185 international matches. The player who was second highest international goals scorer in hockey and highest goal scorer in modern hockey on artificial turf was Paul Litjens of Netherlands. He scored a total of 268 international goals in 177 matches. He remained highest international goals scorer on artificial turf for 22 years, from 1982 to 2004, until Sohail Abbas of Pakistan broke the record against India at Amritsar in 2004. Abbas became the sixth Pakistani to achieve 100 international goals in his career when he scored a hat-trick against Great Britain at the 2000 Summer Olympics. He scored a record 348 international goals. He also played the fewest matches to score 100 goals on artificial turf.

The first player from India to score 100 goals on artificial turf is Dhanraj Pillay, who scored a total of 170 international goals. Manzoor-ul-Hassan of Pakistan was the first player from Asia to score 100 international goals on artificial turf. The first player outside of Asia and Europe to score 100 international goals was Mark Hager of Australia. To date, ten players representing Netherlands, and Pakistan each have scored 100 or more international goals, the most of any country. The Asian Hockey Federation and European Hockey Federation has the highest number of players who have scored 100 goals in their international career, with 21 players each from both confederation achieving the feat so far.

By player 
As of 4 April 2022 (UTC)

By nationality

By confederation

Footnotes

See also 
List of men's footballers with 50 or more international goals

References 

Field hockey-related lists
Lists of field hockey players